DNA-directed RNA polymerase III subunit RPC5 is an enzyme that in humans is encoded by the POLR3E gene.

Interactions
POLR3E has been shown to interact with POLR3D.

Notes and references

Further reading